Andre Hollins (born 11 December 1992) is an American professional basketball player 

He grew up in Memphis, Tennessee and went to White Station High School there. He went to the University of Minnesota and played for the Minnesota Golden Gophers during college and entered the NBA draft in 2015, but was undrafted and became an Unrestricted FA. 

He has since played in Europe and is currently with the Hungarian League.
On January 2, 2022 it was announced on social media that he and current Minnesota Lynx star Rachel Banham were getting married as the couple were at Williams Arena for a proposal.

References

External links
LNB Pro B profile
Minnesota Golden Gophers profile
Eurobasket.com profile

1992 births
Living people
American expatriate basketball people in Belgium
American expatriate basketball people in France
American expatriate basketball people in Hungary
American men's basketball players
Basketball players from Memphis, Tennessee
Chorale Roanne Basket players
Leuven Bears players
Minnesota Golden Gophers men's basketball players
Point guards
Shooting guards